Brats is a 1991 Hungarian drama film directed by János Rózsa. The film was selected as the Hungarian entry for the Best Foreign Language Film at the 64th Academy Awards, but was not accepted as a nominee.

Cast
 Csaba Újvári as Zoli
 Bernadett Visy as Rita
 Zsolt Gazdag as Laci
 Szabolcs Hajdu as Attila
 Dani Szabó as Csoma

See also
 List of submissions to the 64th Academy Awards for Best Foreign Language Film
 List of Hungarian submissions for the Academy Award for Best Foreign Language Film

References

External links
 
 

1991 films
1991 drama films
Hungarian drama films
1990s Hungarian-language films